was a feudal domain under the Tokugawa shogunate of Edo period Japan, located in Ise Province and in Iga Province in what is part of now modern-day Tsu, Mie. It was centered around Tsu Castle. Tsu Domain was controlled the tozama Tōdō clan throughout most of its history.

History
Tsu was known as "Anotsu" during the Sengoku period and was controlled by the Kudo clan, who were originally from Shinano Province. Oda Nobunaga's invasion of Ise in 1568 was resolved by the Kudo clan adopting Nobunaga's younger brother, Oda Nobukane as heir. Following Nobunaga's death, Nobukane swore fealty to Toyotomi Hideyoshi, but in 1594 he was transferred to Ōmi Province.  Hideyoshi assigned the territory to Tomita Tomonobu, with a  kokudaka of 50,000 koku. On his death in 1599, he was succeeded by his son, Tomita Nobutaka, who approached Tokugawa Ieyasu. He assisted Ieyasu in the invasion of Aizu, but was later defeated at the Battle of Aonutsu Castle by a pro-Toyotomi coalition. Following the 1600 Battle of Sekigahara, Tokugawa Ieyasu reinstated Tomita Nobukane as daimyō of Tsu Domain, with an increase in kokudaka to 70,000 koku. He was transferred to Uwajima Domain in Iyo Province in 1608. 

The domain was then given to Tōdō Takatora, with a kokudaka of 220,000 koku. Although a tozama daimyō, Tōdō Takatora received special treatment from Tokugawa Ieyasu from an early stage, and had been entrusted with the construction of Edo Castle. He also performed well during the Siege of Osaka and his holdings were increased with additional territories in Iga Province, bringing his total to 270,000 koku. He gained another 50,000 koku in 1617 in southern Ise, to which he added 3000 koku in Shimōsa Province which were originally the patrimony of his younger brother.  His total holdings of 323,000 koku were the ninth largest in Japan, excluding the shimpan Tokugawa and Matsudaira domains. In 1619 Tokugawa Yorinobu was transferred to Wakayama Castle, and the 50,000 koku Tamaru region of southern Ise was transferred from Tsu to Kii Domain; however, Tōdō Takatora received equivalent holdings in Yamato and Yamashiro Provinces in compensation. However, on the retirement of Tōdō Takatsugu in 1669, 50,000 koku of his holdings were split off to allow his second son to establish a cadet branch of the clan at Hisai Domain. Another 3000 koku were given to a third son, leaving the 3rd daimyō, Tōdō Takahisa, with an inheritance of 270,950 koku. The domain was often beset by natural disasters, including three large earthquakes, and bad harvests, which kept the domain's finances on precarious footing. A major peasant uprising occurred during the tenure of the 9th daimyō, Tōdō Takamine. The 10th  daimyō, Tōdō Takasato succeeded with fiscal reforms, and encouraged forestry and sericulture. He also established the han school "Yuzoukan," at Tsu, and the branch "Chouhirodo," in Iga, in which study of the various schools of Japanese swordsmanship were promoted.

The situation deteriorated again under the 11th daimyō, Tōdō Takayuki, and natural disasters such as bad harvests and earthquakes occurred one after another, driving the domain deeply into debt. With the start of the Boshin War, he proclaimed the domain's neutrality, stating that he refused to participate in what he viewed as a private feud between Satsuma and Aizu. However, after the Battle of Toba Fushimi, he was visited by a messenger from Emperor Meiji, and his local commanders decided to assist the Satchō Alliance by attacking the retreating shogunate forces. This contributed greatly to then imperial victory, and greatly demoralized the Tokugawa forces who were shocked at Tsu Domain's sudden defection. The forces of Tsu Domain served in the vanguard of the imperial advance down the Tōkaidō. In 1868, Tōdō Takayuki was appointed imperial governor of Tsu, but there was much local dissatisfaction with his rule and numerous uprisings until his retirement in 1871. The final  daimyō, Tōdō Takakiyo, served only a few weeks as imperial governor before the abolition of the han system.

Holdings at the end of the Edo period
As with most domains in the han system, Tsu Domain consisted of several discontinuous territories calculated to provide the assigned kokudaka, based on periodic cadastral surveys and projected agricultural yields. 

Ise Province 
15 villages in Mie District
29 villages in Kawawa District 
3 villages in Suzuka District
73 villages in Anō District
56 villages in Ichishi District
33 villages in Iino District
20 villages in Taki District
Yamashiro Province
14 villages in Sōraku District
Yamato Province
42 villages in Soekami District
9 villages in Shikijō District
24 villages in Toichi District
59 villages in Yamabe District
Iga Province (entire province)
69 villages in Ahai District
26 villages in Yamada District
41 villages in Nabari District
61 villages in Iga District

List of daimyō

Genealogy (simplified)

Tōdō Torataka, an ashigaru. 
 I.Takatora, 1st daimyō of Tsu (cr. 1608) (1556–1630; r. 1608–1630)
 II. Takatsugu, 2nd daimyō of Tsu (1602–1676; r. 1630–1669)
 III. Takahisa, 3rd daimyō of Tsu (1638–1703; r. 1669–1703).
Takamichi, 1st daimyō of Hisai (cr. 1669) (1644–1697)
  V. Takatoshi, 5th daimyō of Tsu (1693–1728; r. 1708–1728)
  IV. Takachika, 4th daimyō of Tsu (1667–1708; r. 1703–1708)
Takakiyo (1585–1640)
Takahide
Takaaki (1645–1711)
Takatake
 VII. Takaaki, 7th daimyō of Tsu (1717–1785; r. 1735–1769)
 VIII. Takanaga, 8th daimyō of Tsu (1751–1770; r. 1769–1770).
 IX. Takasato, 9th daimyō of Tsu (1746–1806; r. 1770–1806)
 X. Takasawa, 10th daimyō of Tsu (1781–1825; r. 1806–1824)
 XI. Takayuki, 11th daimyō of Tsu (1813–1895; r. 1825–1869)
Takakiyo, 20th family head, 1st Count (1837–1889; Governor of Tsu: 1869–1871, Count: 1884)
Takatsugu, 21st family head, 2nd Count (1884–1943; 21st family head and 2nd Count: 1889–1943)
Takatei, 22nd family head, 3rd Count (1917–1946; 22nd family head and 3rd Count: 1943–1946)
Takamasa, 23rd family head, 4th Count (b. 1944; 23rd family head and 4th Count: 1946–1947; 23rd family head: 1947–present)
 Takahito (b. 1972)
  VI. Takaharu, 6th daimyō of Tsu (1710–1735; r. 1728–1735)

See also 
 List of Han
 Abolition of the han system
 Hisai Domain

References

Domains of Japan
1601 establishments in Japan
1871 disestablishments in Japan
Ise Province
Iga Province
History of Mie Prefecture
Tsu, Mie